Federal Chancellery may refer to:
 Federal Chancellery of Austria
 German Chancellery
 Federal Chancellery of Switzerland
 Federal Chancellery (Bonn), a building
 Federal Chancellery (Berlin), a building